Jeffrey Davies may refer to:

 Jeffrey Davies (guitarist) (born 1967), with The Brian Jonestown Massacre
 Jeffrey Davies (wine merchant), American

See also
 Jeff Davis (disambiguation)
 Geoff Davis (disambiguation)
 Geoff Davies (disambiguation)